Andrew Warren (born 1958) is an English bassist. He was originally in the band Adam and the Ants, but left in 1979 to join former bandmates Bid and Lester Square in The Monochrome Set.

Since 2004, he has been a member of British indie-pop band Would-Be-Goods. In 2010 he co-reformed The Monochrome Set with Bid and Lester Square.

References

External links

English rock bass guitarists
Male bass guitarists
Adam and the Ants members
1958 births
Living people